George Frederick Price Darrell (1851–1921) was an Australian playwright best known for The Sunny South (1883), which was made into a film The Sunny South or The Whirlwind of Fate.

Darrell began his professional career with Simonsen's Opera Company in New Zealand; but, on migrating to Melbourne, took to the regular dramatic profession, earning some distinction as a juvenile supporter of the once idolised Walter Montgomery. He married Mrs. Robert Heir (née Fanny Cathcart), the admirable tragédienne, and subsequently visited professionally America and England, where, at the Grand Theatre, Islington, he produced his play The Sunny South.

His last play, The Land of Gold was staged by Charles Holloway at the Criterion Theatre, Sydney in 1907.

In 1878 he formed the "Australian Dramatic Company", which name was subsequently used by Alfred Dampier, but the connection between the two, if any, has not been found.

Darrell's body was washed ashore at Dee Why on 29 January 1921. He had died by drowning, found to be suicide as evidenced by the note he left for his landlady, Mrs Barnet.

As a playwright his name has been confused with that of Charles Darrell, author of When London Sleeps, The Power and the Glory and Defender of the Faith.

Select writings
Man and Wife (1871)
Matrimonial Manoeuvres (1872)
Dark Deeds (1873)
Friends of the Flag ; Or, The Struggle for Freedom (1874)
Her Face, Her Fortune (1874)
The Trump Card (1874)
The Four Fetes (1875)
Transported for Life (1876)
Back from the Grave (1878)
The Forlorn Hope ; or, A Tale of Tomorrow (1879)
Solange (1882)
The Naked Truth (1883)
The Sunny South (1883)
The Squatter (1885)
The Soggarth (1886)
The New Rush (1886)
Hue and Cry (1888)
The Mystery of a Hansom Cab aka Midnight Melbourne (1888) – stage version of the Fergus Hume novel The Mystery of a Hansom Cab
The Queen of Bohemia (1888)
The Pakeha (1890)
Mr Potter of Texas (1890)
The Lucky Lot (1890)
The Double Event (1893)
The Crimson Thread (1894)
Convict Once (1896)
The Land of Dawning (1896)
The Queen of Coolgardie (1897)
The Sorrows of Satan (1897)
The Light That Failed (1899)
The Adventures of Louis de Rougemont (1899)
The Punter (1902)
Sappho (1902)
Justice or Murder (1902)
Paris and Pleasure (1904)
The Battle and the Breeze (1905)
The Belle of the Bush (1916) – novel

References

External links
George Darrell at AusLit
George Darrell at State Library of New South Wales

1851 births
1921 deaths
Australian male dramatists and playwrights
Australian male stage actors
19th-century Australian male actors
19th-century Australian dramatists and playwrights
20th-century Australian dramatists and playwrights